Microsoft Connected Services Framework (CSF) is a discontinued service-aggregation SOA platform from Microsoft. Developed on the .NET Framework, CSF enables scalable, loosely coupled service-based solutions. The session is the core component of the framework involved in routing messages between participants (participants may be .NET components or web services). Complex Routing can be accomplished by external .NET or BizTalk driver services. CSF is not a replacement for BizTalk; rather, it simplifies orchestrations by removing service specific operations and allowing focus on business/process logic.

External links
 Connected Services Framework Documentation
 Connected Services Framework Developer Center
 Connected Services Framework Team Blog

.NET Framework software
Service-oriented architecture-related products